Clint Peay (born September 16, 1973 in Columbia, Maryland) is an American soccer coach and former player. He was a regular on the U.S. junior national teams and U.S. Olympic team in the mid-1990s.  He also spent several years with D.C. United in Major League Soccer.

Youth
Peay grew up in Columbia, Maryland and attended Oakland Mills High School where he played on the boys' soccer team.  After graduating from high school, he attended the University of Virginia where he was a defender on the men’s soccer team from 1991 to 1995.  During Peay’s four seasons, the Cavaliers won the NCAA championship four consecutive years.  Of note, Oakland Mills won the Maryland State Championship and was ranked #1 in the state at the end of Peay's senior year.  In Peay's four years at the University of Virginia, his teams also won their respective championships, each time ending the year ranked #1.  For his first two years with the DC United, his team won the MLS Championship.  Finally in or about 2000, Peay's decade long run of season ending championships came to an end when the DC United did not successfully defend their MLS Championship. He did.

Junior National and Olympic Teams
In 1993, Peay was the captain of the U.S. U-20 national team that competed at the U-20 World Cup.  The U.S. went 1-1-1 in the first round, qualifying for the second round where the team fell to Brazil 3-0.  1995, Peay was a member of the U.S. team at the 1995 Pan American games.  The U.S. went 0-3 and did not make the second round.  That year Peay also was on the U.S. team at the World University Games. In 1996, Bruce Arena, who coached Peay at the University of Virginia, selected Peay for the U.S. soccer team at the 1996 Summer Olympics.  The U.S. went 1-1-1, but failed to qualify for the second round.  Peay played all three games as a central defender.

Club career
Arena continued to turn to Peay when D.C. United of Major League Soccer (MLS) drafted him in the ninth round (90th overall) of the 1996 MLS Draft.  In 1996, Peay saw time in twenty-four games, twenty-three, as United went to the MLS championship and the U.S. Open Cup title.  Peay’s playing dropped significantly as in 1997 as he started only eight games.  In 1998, it fell further as he played only 394 minutes in six games before United waived Peay on June 30, 1998.  When Peay became available, the Charleston Battery of the U.S. Second Division, signed him.  He then played eight games with the Battery in 1998.  At the end of the season, the Battery traded Peay to the Maryland Mania for first round 1999 draft pick.  However, on May 13, 1999, D.C. United signed Peay, ironically as a discovery player.  In 1999, Peay saw even fewer minutes than in 1998, a total of only 241 in five games.  Then, during the 2000 pre-season, he tore the anterior cruciate ligament in his left knee.  While he attempted to work himself back into playing condition, he realized he could not and retired on November 8, 2000.

Following his retirement from playing professionally, Peay became United’s broadcast announcer.

Coaching
On January 27, 2003, Georgetown University hired Peay as an assistant coach.  In 2004, he moved to Davidson College as an assistant coach to the men’s soccer team.  He held that position until 2008 when he moved to George Mason University as an assistant. After George Mason, he accepted the men's head coaching job at the University of Richmond, which he started effective February 1, 2009. 

In July 2012, Peay resigned from the men's head coaching job at Richmond to accept a position with the USMNT. In February 2019, Peay joined the North Carolina FC staff as an assistant coach to Dave Sarachan.

On November 25 2019, Peay was announced as the first ever head coach of the newly formed Revolution II, starting competition in the USL-League One in the 2020 season.

Family
Peay is married with three children.

References

External links

 Charleston Battery bio
 Davidson bio
 D.C. United stats
 George Mason University bio

1973 births
Living people
People from Columbia, Maryland
American soccer coaches
American soccer players
Soccer players from Maryland
Charleston Battery players
D.C. United players
Footballers at the 1996 Summer Olympics
Georgetown Hoyas men's soccer coaches
Major League Soccer players
Maryland Mania players
Northern Virginia Royals players
Davidson Wildcats men's soccer coaches
Richmond Spiders men's soccer coaches
Olympic soccer players of the United States
University of Virginia alumni
Virginia Cavaliers men's soccer players
United States men's under-23 international soccer players
Pan American Games competitors for the United States
Footballers at the 1995 Pan American Games
Association football defenders